Elisabeth Gantt (born 1934) is a botanist, known for her work in plant physiology and structure. Born in Yugoslavia, she later immigrated to the United States, where she got her Ph.D. at Northwestern University. Her work mostly focused on photosynthesis, especially that of algae. Today, she is a Distinguished University Professor at the University of Maryland, where she still studies and teaches botany and cell biology, which is a part of the University of Maryland College of Computer, Mathematical, and Natural Sciences. Her work has garnered her the Darbaker Prize from the Botanical Society of America in 1958 and the Gilbert Morgan Smith Medal of the National Academy of Sciences in 1994. Dr. Gantt was inducted into the National Academy of Sciences in 1996. She is also a member of several scientific societies, including the National Research Council, the American Society of Plant Physiologists (serving as president) and the American Association for the Advancement of Science.

References

Women botanists
20th-century American women scientists
21st-century American botanists
Living people
1934 births
Northwestern University alumni
University of Maryland, College Park faculty
21st-century American women scientists